The Plumsted Township School District is a comprehensive community public school district that educates students in kindergarten though twelfth grade (in addition to special education students in pre-kindergarten) from Plumsted Township, in Ocean County, New Jersey, United States.

As of the 2019–20 school year, the district, comprised of three schools, had an enrollment of 1,216 students and 126.6 classroom teachers (on an FTE basis), for a student–teacher ratio of 9.6:1.

The district is classified by the New Jersey Department of Education as being in District Factor Group "DE", the fifth-highest of eight groupings. District Factor Groups organize districts statewide to allow comparison by common socioeconomic characteristics of the local districts. From lowest socioeconomic status to highest, the categories are A, B, CD, DE, FG, GH, I and J.

History

Plumsted Township voters approved a December 1997 referendum under which $16.5 million would be borrowed to build new school facilities, while the existing middle school would be converted for use as a high school. Later that month, the Commissioner of Education approved the withdrawal, as the feasibility study prepared showed no negative financial impact to either district and would not substantially impact the racial makeup of the students enrolled at Allentown High School. The high school opened its doors in September 1999 and admitted 100 ninth-graders who would graduate in spring 2003, ending a sending/receiving relationship that had existed for more than 50 years with the Upper Freehold Regional School District under which students from the township attended Allentown High School.

Schools
Schools in the district (with 2019–20 enrollment data from the National Center for Education Statistics) are:
Elementary schools
Dr. Gerald H. Woehr Elementary School with 538 students in grades PreK-5
Walter Therien, Principal
Middle school
New Egypt Middle School with 294 students in grades 6-8
Andrea Caldes, Principal
High school
New Egypt High School with 375 students in grades 9-12
Fred Geardino, Principal

Administration
Core members of the district's administration are:
Michelle Halperin-Krain, Superintendent
Sean Gately, Business Administrator / Board Secretary

Board of education
The district's board of education, comprised of seven members, sets policy and oversees the fiscal and educational operation of the district through its administration. As a Type II school district, the board's trustees are elected directly by voters to serve three-year terms of office on a staggered basis, with either two or three seats up for election each year held (since 2012) as part of the November general election. The board appoints a superintendent to oversee the day-to-day operation of the district.

References

External links
Plumsted Township School District

School Data for the Plumsted Township School District, National Center for Education Statistics

Plumsted Township, New Jersey
School districts in Ocean County, New Jersey
New Jersey District Factor Group DE